The Bellanca SE was an American carrier-based scout monoplane designed and built for the United States Navy by the Bellanca Aircraft Company.

Variants
XSE-1
The XSE-1, of 1932, was a two-seat high-wing cabin monoplane with folding wings, powered by a  Wright R-1820F radial engine. It was not ordered into production and only one prototype (A-9186) was built, which crashed before delivery.
XSE-2 The XSE-1 was re-designed with stronger structure, larger fin and powered by a Wright R-1510 14-cylinder 2-row radial engine. Reportedly re-used the serial number of the destroyed XSE-1.

Specifications

See also

References

Notes

Bibliography

 

S01E
1930s United States military reconnaissance aircraft
Single-engined tractor aircraft
High-wing aircraft
Aircraft first flown in 1932